Pantelis Psychas (born 1887, date of death unknown) was a Greek water polo player. He competed at the 1920 Summer Olympics and the 1924 Summer Olympics.

References

External links
 

1887 births
Year of death missing
Greek male water polo players
Olympic water polo players of Greece
Water polo players at the 1920 Summer Olympics
Water polo players at the 1924 Summer Olympics
Place of birth missing